The 1924 Springfield Red and White football team was an American football team that represented Springfield College as an independent during the 1924 college football season. Led by first-year head coach John L. Rothacher, Springfield compiled a record of 4–2–1. John B. Stoeber the team's captain. Springfield played their home games at Pratt Field in Springfield, Massachusetts.

Schedule

References

Springfield
Springfield Pride football seasons
Springfield Red and White football